The 2022 BC Men's Curling Championship, the provincial men's curling championship for British Columbia, was held from January 4 to 9 at the Kamloops Curling Club in Kamloops, British Columbia. The winning Jeff Richard team represented British Columbia at the 2022 Tim Hortons Brier in Lethbridge, Alberta. The event was held in conjunction with the 2022 British Columbia Scotties Tournament of Hearts, the provincial women's curling championship.

The event was originally intended to be played at the McArthur Island Event Centre, but was moved behind closed-doors to the Kamloops Curling Club due to COVID-19 precautions.

Teams
The teams are listed as follows:

Knockout brackets

Source:

A event

B event

C event

Knockout results
All draw times listed in Pacific Time (UTC−08:00).

Draw 1
Tuesday, January 4, 2:00 pm

Draw 2
Tuesday, January 4, 7:00 pm

Draw 4
Wednesday, January 5, 2:00 pm

Draw 5
Wednesday, January 5, 7:00 pm

Draw 6
Thursday, January 6, 9:00 am

Draw 7
Thursday, January 6, 2:00 pm

Draw 8
Thursday, January 6, 7:00 pm

Draw 9
Friday, January 7, 9:00 am

Draw 10
Friday, January 7, 2:00 pm

Playoffs

A vs. B
Saturday, January 8, 9:00 am

C1 vs. C2
Saturday, January 8, 9:00 am

Semifinal
Saturday, January 8, 7:00 pm

Final
Sunday, January 9, 2:00 pm

Notes

References

2022 in British Columbia
Curling in British Columbia
2022 Tim Hortons Brier
January 2022 sports events in Canada
Sport in Kamloops